Roztocze (Roztochia) is a range of hills in east-central Poland and western Ukraine which rises from the Lublin Upland and extends southeastward through Solska Forest and across the border into Ukrainian Podolia. Low and rolling, the range is approximately 180 km long and 14 km wide. Its highest peak within Poland is Wielki Dział at 390 meters, while in Ukraine it is Vysokyi Zamok (Lviv High Castle) at 409 m. In Poland Roztocze lies in the Lublin and Podkarpackie voivodships, while the portion in Ukraine extends all the way to the outskirts of Lviv. In 2011 UNESCO established the Roztochya Biosphere Reserve. The Polish portion of the range makes up the Roztocze National Park.

Inhabitation
Main cities and towns of the Roztocze range include: Biłgoraj, Hrubieszów, Janów Lubelski, Józefów, Krasnobród, Kraśnik, Lubaczów,  Narol, Nemyriv, Szczebrzeszyn, Tomaszów Lubelski, Yavoriv, Zamość, Zhovkva, and Zwierzyniec.

Points of interest in Roztocze region

References

 Information about the region from www.roztocze.com
 Information service about Roztocze (in Polish)
 Information service and photo gallery about Roztocze (in Polish)
 Roztocze landscapes - Fine Art Photography by Tomasz Dziubinski
 Roztocze landscapes - Photography by Jola Dziubinska
 Roztocze architecture - Fine Art Photography by Tomasz Dziubinski
 Roztocze places - Photography by Jola Dziubinska
 Roztocze places - Photography by mojeroztocze.pl
 Ukrainian Roztochia
 UNESCO Biosphere in 2011

Plateaus of Ukraine
Hills of Poland
Landforms of Lublin Voivodeship
Landforms of Podkarpackie Voivodeship
Volhynian-Podolian Upland